Cryptocephalus albicans is a species of case-bearing leaf beetle in the family Chrysomelidae. It is found in North America.

References

Further reading

 
 
 

albicans
Articles created by Qbugbot
Beetles described in 1849